William or Willi Ziegler may refer to:
William Ziegler (industrialist) (1843–1905), American industrialist
William Ziegler Jr. (1891–1958), adopted son
William Ziegler III (ca 1929–2008), owner of Swisher International Group and son of Ziegler Jr.
William Ziegler (film editor) (1909–1977), American film editor
Willi Ziegler (1929–2002), German paleontologist

See also
 William Ziegler House, mansion of Ziegler Jr.
 William and Helen Ziegler House, second mansion of Ziegler Jr.